Makame Rashidi (died April 14, 2013) was a Tanzanian military officer and diplomat, the Ambassador to Malawi, and the leader of Tanzania People's Defence Force (1989–2001).

References

2013 deaths
Ambassadors of Tanzania to Malawi
Year of birth missing